A reptile is a tetrapod vertebrate of the taxonomic class Reptilia, including crocodilians, snakes, lizards and turtles.

Reptile or Reptilia may also refer to:

 The Reptile, a 1966 film directed by John Gilling
 Reptile (Mortal Kombat), a fictional character from the Mortal Kombat video game series
 Reptiles (M. C. Escher), a lithograph print by M. C. Escher
 Reptiles (magazine), a pet-hobby magazine
 Reptilia (manga), a Japanese horror manga
 Reptile (software), a web syndication program
 Reptilia (zoo), a Canadian reptile zoo
 Reptilia, a novel by Thomas Thiemeyer

In music:
 Reptile (band) (Risaeðlan), an Icelandic band
 Reptile (album), an album by Eric Clapton
 "Reptile" (song), a song by The Church
 "Reptilia" (song), a song by The Strokes
 "Reptile", a song by Dimmu Borgir from Spiritual Black Dimensions
 "Reptile", a song by Nine Inch Nails from The Downward Spiral
 "Reptile", a song by Skrillex from Mortal Kombat: Songs Inspired by the Warriors
 "Reptile", a song by Periphery from Periphery IV: Hail Stan

See also
Reptil, a fictional character in the Marvel Comics universe
Rep-tile, a term for self-replicating tilings.
Reptilian (disambiguation)